Nathan Sepulveda (born December 6, 2002) is an American professional soccer player.

Career

Youth 
Sepulveda played with the Sporting Arsenal academy in California, where he scored 3 goals in 28 appearances, and then spent a season with the FC Golden State academy, where he made 18 appearances.

Professional
On April 5, 2021, it was announced that Sepulveda had signed a professional contract with USL Championship side Las Vegas Lights , becoming their youngest ever signing. He his professional debut on May 5, 2021, starting in a 5–0 loss to LA Galaxy II.

References

2002 births
American soccer players
Association football midfielders
Las Vegas Lights FC players
Living people
People from Walnut, California
Soccer players from California
USL Championship players